Don't Wait is the first solo studio album released by Adie on September 26, 2006.

Track listing

References

2006 albums
BEC Recordings albums